BRP Heracleo Alano (PC-376) is the sixth ship of the  coastal patrol boats of the Philippine Navy. It is part of the first batch of its class ordered through U.S. Foreign Military Sales (FMS) in 1990, and was commissioned with the Philippine Navy in January 1992. It was initially designated as Fast Patrol Craft, and was numbered "DF-376", but later on was re-designated as a Patrol Gunboat, and was finally re-numbered as "PG-376". Another round of reclassification was made in April 2016, which redesignated the patrol gunboat as the coastal patrol craft BRP Heracleo Alano (PC-376)

Technical details
The ship was built to U.S. Coast Guard standards with aluminum hull and superstructure.

The ship originally designed to carry one bow Mk.3 40 mm gun, one 81 mm  mortar aft, and four 12.7 mm/50 caliber machine guns. Instead, she is armed with only four M2HB Browning 12.7 mm/50 caliber machine guns on Mk.26 mounts, with two positioned forward and two aft; and two M60 7.62 mm/30 caliber machine guns, both mounted amidships. The ship can carry 4,000 rounds of 12.7 mm and 2,000 rounds of 7.62 mm A large "Big Eyes" binocular is also carried on tripod mounts, one on the forecastle and one just above the mast.

As part of the first batch (PG-370 to PG-378), it is not equipped with Mk.38 Mod.0 Bushmaster 25mm chain gun.. She was also the test ship for Project "Trident Strike" remote operated gun mount system of the Philippine Navy Naval Sea Systems Command and Mapua Institute of Technology. It was planned to install either a stabilized or unstabilized M242 25 mm Bushmaster chain gun on her bow after some minor modifications, but as of to date has not materialized. In May 2022, she was used as the test ship for Project BUHAWI, a successor program to Trident Strike, which also saw the installation and test firing of a remote controlled weapon station on the ship.

She is equipped with a Raytheon AN/SPS-64(V)11 surface search and navigation radar but with a smaller antenna as those used in bigger Philippine Navy ships.

A 4-meter rigid inflatable boat powered by a 40-hp outboard motor is stowed amidships.

Service history

Footnotes

References

External links
 Philippine Navy Official website
 Philippine Fleet Official Website
 Philippine Defense Forum @ Timawa.net - BRP Heracleo Alano (PG-376) - Jose Andrada class

Patrol vessels of the Philippine Navy